Hassan Kordestani is an Iranian football defender who played for Iran. He also played for Taj SC.

References

External links
 
 Hassan Kordestani at teammelli.com

Iranian footballers
Association football defenders
Esteghlal F.C. players
Year of birth missing
Iran international footballers